The Social Democratic Liberal Party (SODELPA) is a Fijian political party. The party was formed in January 2013 after the dissolution of the Soqosoqo Duavata ni Lewenivanua. The party currently has no party leader.

History

Party foundation 
In January 2013 Fiji's military regime promulgated new regulations governing the registration of political parties. Among the new provisions was a requirement that all political parties be named in English rather than Fijian. In order to retain the same acronym, the Soqosoqo Duavata ni Lewenivanua (SDL) reformed as the Social Democratic Liberal Party in order to retain the 'SDL' acronym. However, a subsequent amendment to the Political Parties Decree banned the use of the acronyms of former parties, forcing the party to change its acronym to 'SODELPA'.

The party was provisionally led by Dr Tupeni Baba, but in March 2013 it unanimously selected former SDL Cabinet Minister Ro Teimumu Kepa as its first permanent leader.

The party applied for registration on 26 February 2013, and was registered on 3 May 2013.

2014 elections 
The party contested the 2014 elections, naming a list of 45 candidates in June. In July, it released its manifesto, promising to reduce poverty, restore the Great Council of Chiefs, and revive the Qoliqoli Bill, which had been stopped by the 2006 coup. The party gained 28.2 percent of the vote and 15 seats in Parliament. Following the election, party leader Teimumu Kepa became Leader of the Opposition.

In June 2016, Kepa announced that she was standing down as leader of SODELPA. She was replaced by former Prime Minister Sitiveni Rabuka.

2018 elections 
The party ran 51 candidates in the 2018 elections, seven of whom were women. It campaigned on a platform of restoring the 1997 constitution, promising to restore the Great Council of Chiefs within a hundred days if elected, and to consider changing the electoral system to restore communal constituencies. The party won 39.85% of the vote, increasing its number of MPs from 15 to 21.

2020 suspension and leadership 
On 26 May 2020, the party was suspended for 60 days for breaching the Political Parties Act. All appointees were declared null and void, and were given 60 days to rectify their issues or face deregistration. The registrar stated that the party's Vice President, Vijay Singh, is the only legitimate officeholder in the party. The party's suspension was lifted on 29 June.

In November 2020 the party elected Viliame Gavoka as leader, replacing Sitiveni Rabuka.

2022 elections 
The party contested the 2022 elections. On 30 April 2022 it announced an initial list of 28 candidates. The party ran 54 candidates during the election and finished fourth, obtaining 5.14% of the vote and receiving 3 seats in parliament. As neither known electoral alliance received a majority of seats, the party received kingmaker status. On 18 December, 2022, the party revealed its "non-negotiable" terms to enter into coalition, and is in discussions with other parties. Once the final results were released, in accordance with SODELPA's constitution, Gavoka ceased to be leader as the party did not obtain a parliamentary majority. General Secretary Lenaitasi Duru announced the role of party leader would remain vacant until SODELPA's annual general meeting in 2024.

SODELPA announced its list of non-negotiable terms which included bringing back the Great Council of Chiefs, providing free tertiary education, forgiving student loans, and establishing an embassy in Jerusalem. SODELPA's youth wing demanded the party not form a government with FijiFirst. They also urged the party leadership to reconcile differences with Rabuka to bring Bainimarama's 16-year "dictatorial rule" to an end. On 19 December, SODELPA's management board met to discuss and decide the party they would form a coalition with. FijiVillage reported that some senior members of the management board pushed for a coalition with FijiFirst while others were against it. Ultimately, no decision was made and the party's negotiating team was sent back to the two leading parties to further review some aspects of their offer. A leaked letter from 18 December revealed that FijiFirst was offering ministerial portfolios to all three SODELPA members of parliament, but that SODELPA was intending to gain the post of deputy prime minister.

On 20 December, delegations from the two leading parties met with SODELPA's management board. Negotiations concluded and SODELPA announced the formation of a coalition government with the People's Alliance and its coalition partner, the National Federation Party, effectively ending FijiFirst's eight-year tenure and Bainimarama's 16-year premiership. The management board which consisted of 30 members voted in a secret ballot; 16 voted in favour of the opposition coalition while 14 voted for FijiFirst. The new coalition selected People's Alliance leader Sitiveni Rabuka as Prime Minister designate.

After the announcement, SODELPA's general secretary Duru resigned, claiming there was irregularities in the management board's vote and demanded that the result be declared null and void. He also wrote a letter to President Wiliame Katonivere to postpone the sitting of parliament until "issues were solved". Ultimately, the parliament sitting scheduled for 21 December was delayed as no announcement came from the President. On 21 December, the FijiFirst party refused to concede defeat; general secretary Aiyaz Sayed-Khaiyum said it can only be called after the election of the prime minister by parliament. He also questioned the validity of the new coalition citing concerns raised previously by SODELPA's outgoing general secretary. 

Following communications between the elections supervisor and SODELPA's general secretary, the elections office announced that the decision made by the management board on 20 December was null and void. Some board members whose terms had expired were part of the meeting. As a result, another board meeting was held on 23 December and this time, 13 members voted for the opposition coalition while 12 voted for FijiFirst. The party's outgoing leader, Viliame Gavoka, said "Democracy had won; We went into it fully committed to ensuring that we have the best for this country. We believe and we have agreed on a way forward that benefits this country going forward."

Ideology 
SODELPA is a liberal conservative party, although many party members have been described as social conservatives.

Foreign relations
The party is Zionist and supports recognising Jerusalem as the capital of Israel. One of the conditions of the coalition agreement between the People's Alliance, the NFP and SODELPA was to open a Fijian embassy in Jerusalem.

Health
The party supports the administration of COVID-19 vaccines.

Indigenous people
The party supports bringing back the Great Council of Chiefs, which was a condition of the coalition agreement between the People's Alliance, the NFP and SODELPA.

Social policy
SODELPA opposes same-sex marriage, but also states that it respects the rights of all people.

Electoral history

Parliamentary elections

References 

2013 establishments in Fiji
Political parties established in 2013
Political parties in Fiji
Indigenist political parties in Oceania
Christian political parties